Idoménée (English: Idomeneus) is an opera by the French composer André Campra. It takes the form of a tragédie en musique in a prologue and five acts. Idoménée was first performed on 12 January 1712 by the Académie royale de musique at the Théâtre du Palais-Royal in Paris. The libretto, by Antoine Danchet, is based on a stage play by Crébillon père. It later formed the basis of Giambattista Varesco's libretto for Wolfgang Amadeus Mozart's opera Idomeneo.

Roles

Synopsis
Prologue Vénus visits Eole (Aeolus) in his cavern to ask him to release the winds so she can punish the Greek hero Idoménée (Idomeneus), on his way back from the siege of Troy to his home in Crete.
Act 1: In Crete, Ilione, daughter of King Priam of Troy reveals she has rejected the advances of Idoménée, but is secretly in love with his son Idamante. He returns her love, spurning Electre, who jealously plots revenge. News arrives that Idoménée has been lost in a storm at sea.
Act 2: Idoménee has been shipwrecked but, thanks to the god Neptune, he has survived. He reveals he owes his life to the promise he made to Neptune to sacrifice the first person he should meet on the Cretan shore. To his horror, that person is his own son Idamante.
Act 3: Idoménée has learnt of the love between Ilione and Idamante and is torn between a desire to save his son and jealousy. He orders Idamante to take Electre back to her homeland but as the ship is ready to depart a huge sea monster blocks its way. Neptune is determined to keep Idoménée to his vow.
Act 4: Ilione tells Idamante of Idoménée's love for her. At the temple of Neptune, Idoménée implores the god to release him from his promise. Idamante fights and kills the sea monster.
Act 5: Idoménée announces that he will leave the throne and Ilione to Idamante. But the gods' anger is not yet appeased. They send Idoménée insane and in his fury he mistakenly kills his own son.

Recordings
Idoménée (1731 version) Bernard Deletré, Sandrine Piau, Jean-Paul Fouchécourt, Les Arts Florissants conducted by William Christie (Harmonia Mundi, 1991)

Further reading
Original libretto: Idomenée, Tragedie représentée pour la premiere fois par l'Academie Royale de Musique, Le Mardy douziéme jour de Janvier 1712, Paris, 1712. Gallica, Bibliothèque Nationale de France
Original printed score: Idomenée, Tragedie Mise en Musique par Monsieur Campra, Représentée pour la premiere fois par L'Academie Royale De Musique, Le Mardy douziéme jour de Janvier 1712, Paris, Ballard, 1712
The Viking Opera Guide, ed. Amanda Holden (Viking, 1993)
Summary, recordings, performances, Le magazine de l'opéra baroque

External links

Tragédies en musique
Operas by André Campra
French-language operas
Operas
Opera world premieres at the Paris Opera
1712 operas
Operas based on plays